Adelino  may refer to:

People
 Adelino (given name)
 Adelino (footballer, born 1994), Brazilian football striker

Places
 Adelino, New Mexico, American census-designated place
 Tome-Adelino, New Mexico, American former census-designated place
 Estádio Adelino Ribeiro Novo, Portuguese football stadium for Gil Vicente
 Campo do Adelino Rodrigues, Portuguese football stadium for C.F. União

See also
 
 
 Adelinów, Polish settlement